Taylor Landing is a city in Jefferson County, Texas, United States. It had a population of 228 at the 2010 census.

The city, formerly part of Port Arthur's extraterritorial jurisdiction, voted to incorporate in an election held on September 10, 2005. A total of 124 votes were cast, 80 (64.5%) in favor of incorporation and 44 (35.5%) against.

Taylor Landing is part of the Beaumont–Port Arthur metropolitan area.

Despite being formerly part of Port Arthur’s extraterritorial jurisdiction, residents have a Beaumont, Texas address.

Geography

Texas State Highway 73 forms the southern boundary of the city, leading east to Port Arthur and west  to Winnie.

City government

The Taylor Landing city government consists of a mayor and two commissioners. The mayor and commissioners serve two-year terms. The terms are staggered to prevent all commissioners from being replaced at one time. A sub-committee of the City Commission, the Public Works Committee, is responsible for operations of the city's public utility systems and streets. The committee consists of a public works director and four members all appointed by the City Commission. A City Clerk is appointed by the commission and is responsible for city financial and administrative activities. All elected and appointed officials serve without pay.

Demographics

Education

Public education in the city of Taylor Landing is provided by the Hamshire-Fannett Independent School District.

References

External links

 

Cities in Texas
Cities in Jefferson County, Texas
Cities in the Beaumont–Port Arthur metropolitan area